Pedersen is a Danish and Norwegian patronymic surname, literally meaning "son of Peder". It is the fourth most common surname in Denmark, shared by about 3.4% of the population, and the sixth most common in Norway. It is of similar origin as the surname Petersen.

Listing of people with the surname Pedersen
Aaron Pedersen (born 1970), Australian actor of Arrente/Arabana descent
Abdul Wahid Pedersen (born 1954), Danish Imam
Alexander Pedersen (1891–1955), Norwegian sprinter
Alex Pedersen (cyclist) (born 1966), Danish cyclist
Alf Pedersen (1904–1925), Norwegian boxer
Allen Pedersen (born 1965), Canadian retired professional ice hockey player
Alma Pedersen (born 2005), Danish rhythmic gymnast 
Anne Rygh Pedersen (born 1967), Norwegian politician for the Labour Party
Bente Pedersen (born 1961), Norwegian novelist
Bent-Ove Pedersen (born 1967), Norwegian tennis player
Bernard E. Pedersen, American politician
Bjarne Bent Rønne Pedersen (1935–1993), Danish musician, banjo player and singer
Bjarne Pedersen (born 1978), Danish speedway rider
Blaine Pedersen, Canadian politician in Manitoba
Carl Alfred Pedersen (1882–1960), Norwegian gymnast and triple jumper
Carl Pedersen (gymnast) (1883–1971), Danish gymnast
Carl Pedersen (rower) (1884–1968), Danish rower
Carl-Henning Pedersen (1913–2007), Danish painter
Carsten Pedersen (born 1977), Danish cricketer
Cato Zahl Pedersen (born 1959), Norwegian skier
Charles J. Pedersen (1904–1989), American organic chemist
Chris Pedersen (actor), American actor and film star
Chris Pedersen (musician), Australian drummer
Christian Pedersen (1889–1953), Danish gymnast who competed in the 1920 Summer Olympics
Christiern Pedersen (1480–1554), Danish canon, humanist scholar, writer, printer and publisher
Christina Pedersen (handballer) (born 1982), Danish team handball goalkeeper
Christina Pedersen (referee) (born 1981), Norwegian football referee
Christopher S. Pedersen (born 1986), Norwegian baritone
Dag Erik Pedersen (born 1959), Norwegian road racing cyclist
 Dan A. Pederson, USN, first officer-in-charge of the United States Navy Strike Fighter Tactics Instructor program known as Topgun
David Pedersen (born 1986), Norwegian singer
Dwite Pedersen (1941–2021), American politician
Dynes Pedersen (1893–1960), Danish gymnast
Eigil Pedersen (1917–1994), Danish chess player
Ellen Birgitte Pedersen (born 1955), Norwegian politician
Erik Bue Pedersen (born 1952), Danish handball player
Erik Pedersen (born 1967), Norwegian footballer
Finn Pedersen (1925–2012), Danish rower
George Pedersen (born 1931), Canadian academic administrator
Gerhard Pedersen (1912–1987), Danish boxer
Gitte Pedersen (born 1979), Danish football player
Gro Pedersen Claussen (born 1941) Norwegian graphic designer
Gunner Møller Pedersen (born 1943), Danish composer
Haakon Pedersen (1906–1991), Norwegian speed skater
Hallgeir Pedersen (born 1973), Norwegian jazz guitarist
Hans Eiler Pedersen (1890–1971), Danish gymnast
Hans Pedersen (1887–1943), Danish gymnast
Helga Pedersen (Denmark) (1911–1980), Danish Chief Justice and politician
Helga Pedersen (Norway) (born 1973), Norwegian deputy leader for the Labour Party
Helmer Pedersen (1930–1987), New Zealand Olympic Gold medallist in yachting
Henrik Bolberg Pedersen (born 1960), Danish trumpeter and flugelhorn player with the Danish Radio Jazz Orchestra
Henrik Pedersen (born 1975), Danish professional football player
Herb Pedersen (born 1944), American musician, guitarist, banjo player, and singer-songwriter
Hilde Gjermundshaug Pedersen (born 1964), Norwegian cross-country skier
Holger Pedersen (1867–1953), Danish linguist
Holger Pedersen (born 1946), Danish astronomer at the European Southern Observatory
Inger Pedersen (born 1936), Norwegian politician
Inger Stilling Pedersen (1929–2017), Danish politician
Jørgen V. Pedersen (born 1959), Danish road bicycle racer
Jacob Pedersen (1889–1961), Norwegian track and field athlete
James Pedersen (1868–1944), American politician
Jamie Pedersen (born 1968), American lawyer and politician
Jan O. Pedersen (born 1962), Danish Speedway rider
Jan Ove Pedersen (born 1968), Norwegian football coach and former player
Johanne Samueline Pedersen (1887–1961), Norwegian politician
Johannes Pedersen (1892–1982), Danish gymnast
Johannes Pederson (1883–1977), Danish theologian and linguist
John Pedersen (disambiguation), multiple people
Jonas Pedersen (1871–1953), Norwegian politician
Jostein Pedersen, Norwegian commentator and "music intelligencia"
Karl Pedersen (born 1940), Danish chess player
Katrine Pedersen (born 1977), Danish football midfielder
Kayla Pedersen (born 1989), American basketball player
Kenneth Møller Pedersen (born 1973), Danish professional football midfielder
Kjetil Ruthford Pedersen (born 1973), Norwegian footballer
Knud Pederson (1925–2014), Danish resistance leader and leader of the Churchill Boys
L. C. Pedersen, American politician
Laura Pedersen (born 1965), American author
Lena Pedersen (born 1940), Canadian politician and social worker from Nunavut
Lene Pedersen (born 1977), Norwegian ski mountaineer
Lene Marlin Pedersen (born 1980), Norwegian musician more commonly referred to as Lene Marlin
Mads Pedersen (born 1995), Danish professional racing cyclist
Marc Pedersen (born 1989), Danish professional football player
Marcus Pedersen (born 1990), Norwegian football player
Martin Pedersen (cyclist) (born 1983), Danish professional road bicycle racer
Martin Pedersen (footballer) (born 1983), Danish professional football player
Martin Pedersen (tennis) (born 1987), Danish professional tennis player
Merete Pedersen (born 1973), Danish football midfielder
Mette Pedersen (born 1973), Danish badminton player
Mia Bak Pedersen (born 1980), Danish football defender
Michael Pedersen, (born 1986), Danish cricketer
Mikael Pedersen (1855–1929), Danish inventor associated with the English town of Dursley
Monica Pedersen, American designer on the show "Designed to Sell"
Monika Pedersen, Danish singer of the band Sinphonia
Morten Gamst Pedersen (born 1981), Norwegian football player who currently plays for Blackburn Rovers
Morten Pedersen (born 1972), Norwegian soccer player, who played as defender
Nancy Pedersen, American genetic epidemiologist
Nicki Pedersen (born 1977), Danish motorcycle speedway rider
Nicklas Pedersen (born 1987), Danish professional football striker
Niels-Henning Ørsted Pedersen (1946–2005), Danish jazz bassist
Poul Lars Høgh Pedersen (1959–2021), Danish football goalkeeper
Odd Kvaal Pedersen (1935–1990), Norwegian journalist, author and translator
Olaf Pedersen (gymnast) (1884–1972), Danish gymnast
Olaf Pedersen (1920–1997), Danish historian of science
Oluf Pedersen (gymnast) (1878–1917), Danish gymnast
Ove Pedersen (born 1954), Danish football manager and a former player
Paul Pedersen (composer) (born 1935), Canadian composer
Paul Pedersen (gymnast) (1886–1948), Norwegian gymnast
Peder Larsen Pedersen (1880–1966), Danish gymnast
Peder Oluf Pedersen (1874–1941), Danish engineer and physicist
Peder Pedersen (disambiguation)
Per Pedersen (cyclist) (born 1964), Danish retired road bicycle racer
Per Pedersen (footballer) (born 1969), Danish former football (soccer) player
Peter Dorf Pedersen (1897–1967), Danish gymnast
Peter Pedersen (politician), (born 1954), Swedish Left Party politician
Poul Pedersen (1932–2016), Danish retired football (soccer) player
Ralf Pedersen (born 1973), Danish professional football defenders
Randy Pedersen (born 1962), American professional bowler and color analyst for ESPN
Ray Pedersen, American artist and graphic designer
Red Pedersen (born 1935), former territorial level politician
Rolf Birger Pedersen (1939–2001), Norwegian footballer and football coach
Ronni Pedersen (born 1974), Danish motorcycle speedway rider
Rune Pedersen (born 1963), Norwegian referee in the 1990s
Rune Pedersen (footballer) (born 1979), Danish professional footballer
Søren Pedersen (born 1978), Danish professional football defender
Sigurd Pedersen (1893–1968), Norwegian politician
Simon Azoulay Pedersen (born 1982), Danish professional football player
Snorre Pedersen (born 1972), Norwegian skeleton racer who competed from 1997 to 2005
Solveig Pedersen (born 1965), Norwegian cross country skier
Steinar Pedersen (born 1975), Norwegian football defender
Steinar Pedersen (politician) (born 1947), Norwegian politician
Steve Pedersen, American guitarist from Omaha, Nebraska
Susan Pedersen (historian), American historian currently working at Columbia University
Susan Pedersen (swimmer) (born 1953), American swimmer
Sverre Lunde Pedersen (born 1992), Norwegian speed skater
Terese Pedersen (born 1980), Norwegian handball goalkeeper
Terje Moland Pedersen (born 1952), Norwegian politician
Terje Pedersen (born 1943), Norwegian javelin thrower
Thomas Pedersen (disambiguation), several people
Thor Pedersen (born 1945), Danish politician
Thor Pedersen (rower) (1924–2008), Norwegian competition rower
Torben Mark Pedersen (born 1960), Danish economist and politician, founder of the political party Liberalisterne
Tore Pedersen (born 1969), Norwegian international football defender
Torny Pedersen (born 1946), Norwegian politician
Torsten Schack Pedersen (born 1976), Danish politician
Trond Pedersen (born 1951), Norwegian former football player and coach
Trond Jøran Pedersen (born 1958), Norwegian ski jumper
Trygve Pedersen (1884–1967), Norwegian sailor
Vilhelm Pedersen (1820–1859), Danish artist who illustrated the fairy tales of Hans Christian Andersen
Walter E. Pedersen (1911–1998), American politician
Willy Pedersen (born 1952), Norwegian sociologist

Pedersen  as a middle or hyphenated name
Birger Møller-Pedersen, Norwegian computer scientist and Professor at the University of Oslo
Gustav Natvig-Pedersen (1893–1965), Norwegian politician
Hans Pedersen Herrefosser (born 1800), Norwegian politician
Jørgen Pedersen Gram (1850–1916), Danish actuary and mathematician
Johannes Pedersen Deichmann (born 1790), Norwegian politician
Karl Eirik Schjøtt-Pedersen (born 1959), Norwegian politician
Knut Pedersen Hamsun (1859–1952), Norwegian author who received the Nobel Prize in Literature for 1920
Maya Pedersen-Bieri (born 1972), Swiss skeleton racer
Michael Pedersen Friis (1857–1944), Danish Prime Minister (April 5, 1920 to May 5, 1920)
Morten Pedersen Porsild (1872–1956), Danish botanist who lived and worked in Greenland
Nils Pedersen Igland (1833–1898), Norwegian farmer and politician
Peder Johan Pedersen Holmesland (1833–1914), Norwegian politician
Rasmus Pedersen Thu (1864–1946), Norwegian photographer
Simon Pedersen Holmesland (1823–1895), Norwegian politician
Ulla Pedersen Tørnæs (born 1962), Danish politician and former Minister for Development Cooperation of Denmark

Other references
Kohn Pedersen Fox Associates (KPF) is an international architectural design firm located in New York, London and Shanghai
.276 Pedersen, experimental 7 mm cartridge developed for the U.S. Army and used in the Pedersen rifle
3312 Pedersen (1984 SN), Main-belt Asteroid discovered in 1984
Pedersen bicycle, bicycle designed by Mikael Pedersen
Pedersen Device, attachment developed during World War I for the M1903 Springfield rifle that allowed it to fire a short 0.30 (7.62 mm) caliber intermediate cartridge in semi-automatic mode
Pedersen index, measure of electoral volatility in party systems
Pedersen rifle, United States semi-automatic rifle designed by John Pedersen
Pedersen's law, named after Danish linguist Holger Pedersen, is a Balto-Slavic accent law which states that the stress was retracted from stressed medial syllables in Balto-Slavic mobile paradigms
Pedersen v. Office of Personnel Management, United States lawsuit

See also
Pederson, surname
Petersen, surname

References

Danish-language surnames
Norwegian-language surnames
Patronymic surnames
Surnames from given names

fr:Pedersen